Helen Reynolds Belyea,  (February 11, 1913 – May 20, 1986), was a Canadian geologist best known for her research, in Western Canada, of the Devonian System, a geologic period of the Paleozoic era.

Early life and education
Belyea was born in Saint John, New Brunswick, to a family with French Huguenot origins.

Belyea received both her Bachelor's and master's degrees in Geology from Dalhousie University in Nova Scotia; she earned a Ph.D. from Northwestern University in Evanston, Illinois. Her doctoral thesis was titled "The Geology of Musquach Area, New Brunswick." Before she devoted herself to geology, Belyea worked as a high school teacher and served as a lieutenant in the Royal Canadian Navy.

Research and career
During 1945, Geological Survey of Canada hired Belyea to become a technologist but only a few years later, in 1947, she was given a new job as a geologist. This same year, during the month of February oil was struck in Leduc, Alberta.  Three years later in 1950, Belyea was sent to monitor the oil discovery, making her the first female Canadian Geological Survey geologist to work in the field alongside only men.  After the oil was struck at Leduc, Alberta, the Geological Survey opened an office in Calgary, which was when Belyea was sent to monitor the discovery.  This office eventually led to the creation, in 1967, of the Institute of Sedimentary and Petroleum Geology.

Belyea wrote over 30 scientific papers. Her first paper, on facies relations and reef-off-reef sequences in the upper Devonian, was published in Geological Survey of Canada in 1952. She is known best for contributing to the volume on "Geological History of Western Canada," which is known as "The Atlas." In "The Atlas", she published maps and text for the whole Devonian region based on her work in the late 1950s on a geological survey that mapped the Southern Northwest Territories. She specifically contributed on the region west of Hay River and south of the Mackenzie, and her knowledge of the regional geology helped produce a synthesis for the Devonian rocks of that region.

Belyea was noticed for her contribution to geology in Alberta, where she spent 35 years with the Geological Survey of Canada. Her many awards included the Barlow Memorial Medal for her paper, "Distribution and Lithology of Organic Carbonate Unit of Upper Fairholme Group, Alberta", awarded in 1958. She was the first woman honored this way. She was elected a fellow of the Royal Society of Canada in 1962 and was also made an honorary member of the Canadian Society of Petroleum Geologists. She was one of two geologists sent to open a Calgary office and the only woman to do field work there. In 1976, she was made an Officer of the Order of Canada.

Personal life
Belyea was also active in mountaineering, skiing, walking, and horseback riding. She was an equestrian and rode her horse to many of her field excursions. She rode in the mountains of Alberta, British Columbia and Great Slave Lake area. She was a member of the Calgary Continuing Arts Association, the Women's League of the Calgary Philharmonic and associate director of the Calgary Zoological Society.  She traveled extensively, especially in France. During one her travels in France she gave many lectures.

Belyea was an icon for the world of feminism in geology. Although she herself was not a great supporter of feminism, she showed in her actions that she was a woman of great stature and one to follow and respect. She was the first women to work with men before the 1970s. People thought, in the 19th century, that women should be home cooking and cleaning for their families, but Belyea was an advocate for wanting to work in the field. She became the first women to work in the field studies, proving to everyone that women are strong enough to carry the heavy samples across coarse terrains.

She died in Calgary on May 20, 1986 at the age of 73 years.

Notes

References
Fleming, Iris. "Rocks are Her Forte." Geosciences. Fall 1975, pp. 12–14.
McLaren, Digby J. "Helen Belyea 1913-1986." Transactions of the Royal Society of Canada. Ser. 5, vol. 2. 1987, pp. 198–201.
Ogilvie, Marilyn, and Harvey, Joy, editors. The Biographical Dictionary of Women in Science. Vol. 1. New York: Routledge, 2000, pp. 110–111.

External links
 Helen Belyea 1913-1986
 

1913 births
1986 deaths
Fellows of the Royal Society of Canada
Officers of the Order of Canada
People from Saint John, New Brunswick
20th-century Canadian geologists
Geological Survey of Canada personnel
20th-century Canadian women scientists
Canadian women geologists